The Memphis Trust Building is a historic building in Memphis, Tennessee, U.S.. It was built in 1904 for the Bank of Commerce and Trust. It was designed by Hanker & Cairns. It has been listed on the National Register of Historic Places since November 25, 1980.

References

Buildings and structures on the National Register of Historic Places in Tennessee
Buildings and structures completed in 1904
Office buildings in Memphis, Tennessee